Monopsychism is the belief that all humans share the same eternal consciousness, soul, mind and intellect.  It is also a recurring feature in many mystical traditions.

Aquinas
Thomas Aquinas disagreed with this belief and devoted most of his writing to Averroism and criticized monopsychism. One of his works, a commentary on Aristotle's On the soul, is titled De unitate intellectus contra Averroistas. In this commentary, Aquinas demonstrates how Averroes misinterpreted Aristotle's argument, claiming that the correct interpretation was that an individual's intellect cannot be independent of his or her physical body.

See also
Advaita Vedanta
Collective unconscious
Neoplatonism
Open individualism
Panpsychism
Pantheism
Unus mundus

References

Religious belief and doctrine
Theory of mind